Akiyuki (written: 昭之, 昭如, 章之 or 晃志) is a masculine Japanese given name. Notable people with the name include:

, Japanese sprinter
, Japanese ice dancer
, Japanese writer and politician
, Japanese anime director

Fictional characters
, protagonist of the anime series Xam'd: Lost Memories

Japanese masculine given names